The Fuerte de la Concepción was a Spanish military fortress guarding the port and town of Aguadilla, Puerto Rico, in the 18th and 19th centuries. In 1986, the fort's single surviving building was listed on the U.S. National Register of Historic Places.

See also
National Register of Historic Places listings in Aguadilla, Puerto Rico
 Fuerte de San José

Notes

References

External links
Blog post about the fort 

Forts in Puerto Rico
National Register of Historic Places in Aguadilla, Puerto Rico
Forts on the National Register of Historic Places
1880 establishments in Puerto Rico
Government buildings on the National Register of Historic Places in Puerto Rico
Government buildings completed in 1880